The 2018 Coke Zero Sugar 400 was a Monster Energy NASCAR Cup Series race held on July 7, 2018 at Daytona International Speedway in Daytona Beach, Florida. Contested over 168 laps -- extended from 160 laps due to an overtime finish with two attempts for the first time since 2011, on the  superspeedway, it was the 18th race of the 2018 Monster Energy NASCAR Cup Series season. Erik Jones scored his first career win in the Monster Energy NASCAR Cup Series and for the first time in a decade, Toyota and Joe Gibbs Racing had won a July race at Daytona. It was the first race in NASCAR Cup Series history to have two female pit members.

Report

Background

The race was held at Daytona International Speedway, a race track located in Daytona Beach, Florida, United States. Since opening in 1959, the track is the home of the Daytona 500, the most prestigious race in NASCAR. In addition to NASCAR, the track also hosts races of ARCA, AMA Superbike, USCC, SCCA, and Motocross. The track's  infield includes the  Lake Lloyd, which has hosted powerboat racing. The speedway is owned and operated by International Speedway Corporation.

The track was built in 1959 by NASCAR founder William "Bill" France, Sr. to host racing held at the former Daytona Beach Road Course. His banked design permitted higher speeds and gave fans a better view of the cars. Lights were installed around the track in 1998 and today, it is the third-largest single lit outdoor sports facility. The speedway has been renovated three times, with the infield renovated in 2004 and the track repaved twice — in 1978 and in 2010.

On January 22, 2013, the track unveiled artist depictions of a renovated speedway. On July 5 of that year, ground was broken for a project that would remove the backstretch seating and completely redevelop the frontstretch seating. The renovation to the speedway is being worked on by Rossetti Architects. The project, named "Daytona Rising", was completed in January 2016, and it cost US $400 million, placing emphasis on improving fan experience with five expanded and redesigned fan entrances (called "injectors") as well as wider and more comfortable seating with more restrooms and concession stands. After the renovations, the track's grandstands include 101,000 permanent seats with the ability to increase permanent seating to 125,000. The project was completed before the start of Speedweeks 2016.

Entry list

Practice

First practice

Final practice
Final practice session for Thursday was cancelled due to rain.

Qualifying

Qualifying results

Race

Stage Results

Stage 1
Laps: 40

Stage 2
Laps: 40

Final Stage Results

Stage 3
Laps: 80

Race statistics
 Lead changes: 16 among different drivers
 Cautions/Laps: 10 for 46
 Red flags: 1 for 5 minutes and 1 second
 Time of race: 3 hours, 13 minutes and 12 seconds
 Average speed:

Media

Television
NBC Sports covered the race on the television side. Rick Allen, 2000 Coke Zero 400 winner Jeff Burton and two-time Coke Zero 400 winner Dale Earnhardt Jr. called in the booth for the race. Mike Tirico and Steve Letarte called from the NBC Peacock Pit Box on pit road. Dave Burns, Parker Kligerman, Marty Snider and Kelli Stavast reported from pit lane during the race.

Radio
MRN had the radio call for the race which was also simulcast on Sirius XM NASCAR Radio.

Standings after the race

Drivers' Championship standings

Manufacturers' Championship standings

Note: Only the first 16 positions are included for the driver standings.
. – Driver has clinched a position in the Monster Energy NASCAR Cup Series playoffs.

References

External links

2018 Coke Zero Sugar 400
2018 Monster Energy NASCAR Cup Series
2018 in sports in Florida
Coke Zero Sugar 400